This is a list of Norwegian television related events from 1999.

Events
Unknown - The fourth series of Stjerner i sikte is won by Helene Silvia Moen, performing as Sarah Brightman.

Debuts

International
 Bananas in Pyjamas (TV 2)

Television shows

1990s
Stjerner i sikte (1996-2002)

Ending this year

Sesam Stasjon (1991-1999)

Births

Deaths

See also
1999 in Norway